Shelter Island, known in Cantonese as Ngau Mei Chau is an island located in the water body Port Shelter (Ngau Mei Hoi; literally Cow Tail Sea), in the Sai Kung District, the New Territories, Hong Kong S.A.R., China.

History

The island appeared in a map drawn by Father Simeone Volonteri in 1866, at that time it was marked as Ngau T'au Chü. However, there are criticisms on the accuracy of Volonteri's map in general, or for specific place name such as Green Hill, which historically known as Tuen Mun Hill. There is a rock formation currently called , which connects to the island by intertidal zone. According to a book, Pai means rock, hill or mountain that locates in water body in general in the language of the Tanka people. It is not certain Volonteri's record is correct or not for the name of the island at that time.

The name Shelter island also appeared in a book for sailing directions that published in 1863.

The island was part of a larger region that ceded to the Colony of Hong Kong in 1898.

According to the historical document of the District Office South, the island was uninhabited when it was part of the Port Shelter Firing Range. The firing range was closed in the 1970s. In 2011, a mortar shell was discovered on a beach of the island. Administratively, the District Office South was replaced by the Sai Kung District Office as well as other District Offices after the World War II. At present, Shelter Island still administratively part of the Sai Kung District. It is part of Hang Hau East constituency of the Sai Kung District Council as of 2019 election, despite the island is uninhabited. But in term of environmental protection, the island is surrounded by the Port Shelter Water Control Zone.

Nowadays, it was one of the tourist attraction of the Sai Kung District. The surrounding water of the island is a popular diving site. Such as the shallow waters in the bay Tai Wong Wan, as well as west of Ngau Tau Pai, etc. Commercial divers also catch sea urchin near the island for their own restaurant.

In 2019, human bones were discovered in Tai Wong Wan.

Biodiversity
24 species of vascular plants were discovered on the island.

Coral also appears in the water surrounding the island. However, a survey discovered that the coverage rate was decreasing, from 50.6% to 31.2%, according to the interpretation of Ming Pao in the survey's summary.

According to another research, Shelter Island has a high number of Drupella rugosa and Cronia margariticola, which preys on coral species Pavona decussata and Platygyra sinensis in the region. That research reported that the coverage of hard coral at Shelter Island was 50.2% at that time.

A marine park that covers Sharp Island, Tai Chau, Shelter Island and surrounding water was proposed by the Country and Marine Parks Board, a consultative body for the government in 2014. However, it did not materialize. In 2018, World Wide Fund for Nature also proposed to establish the Port Shelter Marine Protected Area, which also included Shelter Island.

See also

 Ngau Tau Kok, a place in Kowloon, Hong Kong. It also named after "Cow Head".

Footnotes

References

Islands of Hong Kong
Sai Kung District
Populated places in Hong Kong